The Sri Lanka national netball team is the national netball team of Sri Lanka. The team is coached by Thilaka Jinadasa and captained by 
Chathurangi Jayasooriya. As of 21 July 2019, Sri Lanka are ranked 18th in the world.

History
Netball was first played in Sri Lanka in 1921. The first game was played by Ceylon Girl Guide Company at Kandy High School. By 1952, Sri Lankan clubs were playing Indian club sides. In 1956, Sri Lanka played its first international match against Australia's national team in Sri Lanka. In 1963, Sri Lanka was one of eleven teams who participated in the first Netball World Cup. For Ceylon, they would finish in ninth place as they get a win over Wales and Northern Ireland. In 1972, the Netball Federation of Sri Lanka was created. In 1983, Netball Federation of Sri Lanka was dissolved by the government. England's record against Ceylon in international matches between 1949 and 1976 was one win.

Sri Lanka took part in the 1960 Netball Meeting of Commonwealth countries to try to standardise the rules for the game. This meeting took place in Sri Lanka.

Sri Lanka competed in the 7th Asian Youth Netball Championship held in 2010 in India. The Beach Netball Championship 2012 for Men and Women was held at the Beach of Catamaran Beach Hotel, Negombo. Teams from Sri Lanka, India, Pakistan and Maldives participated in this tournament. The Sri Lanka women’s team emerged champions in this section beating the Maldivian team by 19 goals to 10.

Championships 
Sri Lanka emerged the Asian region champions in the M1 Asian Netball Championships 2018 after triumphing over host Singapore 69-50 in the final played at OCBC arena, Singapore on 9 September 2018. This is the fifth time Sri Lanka had emerged as the Asian champions, the last championship won being in 2009. The side was captained by Chathurangi Jayasooriya. Tharjini Sivalingam, the 2.08 m goal-shooter, along with three other players in the starting XI standing over 1.8 m, played a major role in defeating the strong Singaporean side. The Malaysian Team, which Sri Lanka beat in the semi-finals emerged in third place.

The captain said “I am really proud and happy for my coach and my team. In the last eight months, we trained very hard with our coach. We maintained good discipline, as nothing is possible without that. We stuck together and maintained our team bond – I think that is our secret to winning.”

As the top team in the championship, Sri Lanka has automatically qualified for the 2019 Netball World Cup in Liverpool, England.

Competitive record

Players

2015 Sri Lanka Netball World Cup Team

2019 Sri Lanka Netball World Cup Team

See also
 Netball in Sri Lanka

References

External links
 IFNA: Sri Lanka

Netball in Sri Lanka
National netball teams of Asia
Women's national sports teams of Sri Lanka
1956 establishments in Ceylon
Sports clubs established in 1956